Ed Holmes (born 27 December 1995) is a professional rugby union player. He plays in the second row for Bristol Rugby.

He played on 30 March 2018 as Exeter beat Bath Rugby in the final of the Anglo-Welsh Cup. The previous season he had played in the Anglo-Welsh cup final but Exeter lost to Leicester Tigers on that occasion. 

He made senior debut for the Chiefs in the  LV Cup away to the Cardiff Blues in February 2015.

He has spent time on loan at Plymouth Albion where he made over 50 appearances before joining Bristol on 26 March 2018. 

He joined Bristol firstly on loan from Exeter in March 2018, and made the move permanent one month later.

He made his Bristol debut in a 60-17 victory against Nottingham Rugby and drew praise from Bristol head coach Pat Lam for his provenance.

Honours
Anglo-Welsh Cup
Winner  2017-18

Runner-Up  2016-17

References

living people
1993 births